Live is the first official Apocalyptica DVD which consists of a recorded show in Munich, on 24 October 2001.
It only includes tracks from the first 3 albums: Plays Metallica by Four Cellos, Inquisition Symphony and Cult.

Track listing

Videos

It contains 6 official videos listed below too.
<li>"Path"
Director: Mira Thiel & Carsten Gutschmidt
<li>"Path Vol.2"
Director: Kai Sehr
<li>"Harmageddon"
Director: Kare Hellen
<li>"Nothing Else Matters"
Director: Pasi Pauni
<li>"Enter Sandman"
Director: Kare Hellen
<li>"The Unforgiven"
Director: Kare Hellen
Extras

It contains a video called "Little Drummer Boy".
It was recorded in Millbrook, before a Metallica concert, where Apocalyptica opened the show for them.

Personnel

Eicca Toppinen - cello
Antero Manninen - cello (archive footage from “Little Drummer Boy”)
Paavo Lotjonen - cello
Max Lilja - cello
Perttu Kivilaakso - cello

Apocalyptica video albums